Waco is an unincorporated community in Daviess County, Indiana, in the United States.

History
A post office was established at Waco in 1891, and remained in operation until it was discontinued in 1902. It was named after Waco, Texas.

References

Unincorporated communities in Daviess County, Indiana
Unincorporated communities in Indiana